Championship of the Ukrainian SSR among cities teams was a football competition of the Ukrainian SSR before the formal establishing of the Soviet Union. The competition lost its importance with introduction of the Soviet Top League (All Soviet competitions Group A) in 1936 being converted to a regional championship of sports societies and departments.

Until transfer of capital of Ukraine from Kharkiv to Kiev in 1934, the Kharkiv city team was the winner almost every season expect of one. Sometimes at that time frame the western Ukraine became involved in league competitions that were established in Poland in 1927, Polish Football League (1927–1939).

Winners

Results by year
1921. Final tournament (Kharkiv)
Quarterfinals

 Kharkiv - Kherson 5:0
 Tahanroh - Kiev 1:0
 Odessa - Katerynoslav 5:1
 Mykolaiv - Poltava 7:0
Semifinals
 Kharkiv - Tahanroh 2:1
 Odessa - Mykolaiv 1:0
Final
 Kharkiv - Odessa 2:1
Kharkiv: Vinnykov, Levin, Natarov, Shpakovsky, Bem, Bizyayev, Alfyorov, Kapustin, Varzhenynov, Makeyev, Ordin, Kazakov, Romanenko, Lazunenko.
1922. Final tournament (Kharkiv)

Quarterfinals
 Kharkiv - Katerynoslav 2:0
 Kiev - Poltava 3:0
 Odessa - Crimea +:-
 Mykolaiv - Druzhkivka 2:1
Semifinals
 Kharkiv - Mykolaiv 4:0
 Odessa - Kiev 5:2
Final
 Kharkiv - Odessa 1:0
Kharkiv: Romanenko, Kolotukhin, Natarov, Shpakovsky, Romatovsky, Privalov, Bandurin, Kapustin, Varzhenynov, Krotov, Kazakov.
1923. Final tournament (Kharkiv)

Group 1
 Kharkiv - Mykolaiv +:-
 Odessa - Kiev +:-
Group finals
 Kharkiv - Odessa 1:0
Group 2
 Druzhkivka - Poltava 5:1
 Crimea - Katerynoslav 2:1
Group finals
 Druzhkivka - Crimea 2:0
Group 3
 Yuzovka - Chernihiv +:-
 Vinnytsia - Zhytomyr 2:1
Group finals
 Yuzovka - Vinnytsia 8:0
Semifinal
 Yuzivka - Druzhkivka 1:0
Final
 Kharkiv - Yuzovka 1:1, 5:1 (replay)
1924. Final tournament (Kharkiv)

Preliminaries
 Stalino - Katerynoslav 5:0
 Odessa - Podillya +:-
 Kharkiv - Poltava 1:0
 Kiev - Chernihiv +:-
Final tournament (Kiev forfeited)
 Kharkiv - Donbas 2:0
 Kharkiv - Odessa 1:0
 Odessa - Donbas 6:1
Final group. 1) Kharkiv, 2) Odessa, 3) Donbas
Kharkiv: Norov, Krotov, K. Fomin, Privalov, V. Fomin, Kapustin, Kazakov, Alfyorov, Natarov, Shpakovsky, Kostykov, Us, Vinnykov, Bem, Hrushyn, Hubaryev.
1925-1926. ?
1927. Final tournament (Kharkiv)

A mass tournament with participation of some 41 teams took place. To the finals qualified Katerynoslav, Odessa, Mykolaiv, and Stalino. To the finals were also allowed Kharkiv and Kadiyevka, although they were defeated by Mykolaiv and Stalino, respectively.

Games
 Kharkiv: Mykolaiv 10:2, Odessa 1:1, Dnipropetrovsk 4:2, Kadiyevka 4:0, Stalino 5:0
 Mykolaiv: Odessa 2:1, Dnipropetrovsk 5:3, Kadiyevka 3:0, Stalino 2:0
 Odessa: Dnipropetrovsk 4:0, Kadiyevka 3:1, Stalino 4:1
 Dnipropetrovsk: Kadiyevka 4:3, Stalino 4:1
 Kadiyevka: Stalino 0:0
Kharkiv: Kravchenko, Kladko, Krotov, K.Fomin, Privalov, V.Fomin, Semenov, Lesny, Andreyev, Natarov, Shpakovsky, Myshchenko, Us, Sorokin, Bem, M.Fomin, Hubaryev.
1928. Final tournament (Kharkiv)
There were 30 teams participating in the qualifiers.

Games
 Kharkiv: Horlivka 3:1, Mykolaiv 2:1, Dnipropetrovsk 4:1
 Horlivka: Mykolaiv 2:1, Dnipropetrovsk 1:1
 Mykolaiv: Dnipropetrovsk 2:0
Kharkiv: Norov, Kladko, Moskvin, K.Fomin, Privalov, V.Fomin, Semenov, Volodymyrsky, Alfyorov, Kapustin, Shpakovsky, Myshchenko, Hubaryev.
1929-1930. ?
1931. Final tournament (Kiev)
Quarterfinals
 Kiev - Dnipropetrovsk 4:0
 Kadiyevka - Horlivka 2:1
 Stalino - Kharkiv 2:6
 Mykolaiv - Odessa 3:2
Semifinals
 Kiev - Kadiyevka 3:1
 Kharkiv - Mykolaiv 5:2
Final
 Kiev - Kharkiv 3:1
Kiev: Idzkovsky, Denysov, Vesen'yev, Dolhov, Piontkowski, Tyutchev, Sadovsky, Korotkykh, Schultz-Serdyuk, Malkhasov, Svyrydovsky.
1932. Final tournament (Dnipropetrovsk / Zaporizhia)
Preliminaries
 Stalino - Moldavian Autonomy 17:0
 Kharkiv - Stalino +:-
 Dnipropetrovsk - Odessa Region +:-
 Vinnytsia - Kiev 3:1

Games
 Kharkiv: Donbas 4:1, Dnipropetrovsk 6:0, Vinnytsia 1:2
 Donbas: Dnipropetrovsk 4:1, Vinnytsia 3:2
 Dnipropetrovsk: Vinnytsia 3:1
1933. Holodomor
1934.
Quarterfinals
 Kiev - Dnipropetrovsk 6:0
 Moldavian Autonomy - Vinnytsia 0:7
 Khakriv - Chernihiv 10:2
 Odessa - Donbas 5:2
Semifinals
 Vinnytsia - Kiev 0:4
 Kharkiv - Odessa 7:0
Final
 Kiev - Kharkiv 0:1
Kharkiv: Moskvin, Kyryllov, K.Fomin, M.Fomin, V.Fomin, Shvedov, Kulykov, Lesny, Zub, Parovyshnykov, Privalov.
1935. Group 1

Games
 Dnipropetrovsk: Kiev 3:3, Kharkiv 1:2, Odessa 2:1, Stalino 3:0
 Kiev: Kharkiv 3:2, Odessa 1:0, Stalino 0:1
 Kharkiv: Odessa 1:1, Stalino 2:2
 Odessa: Stalino 3:2
Dnipropetrovsk: Makhovsky, Hutaryev, Aleksopolski, Chyzhov, Belov, V.Kryvosheyev, Butenko, Hreber, Andreyev, Borodin, Bily, Laiko, Korchanynov, Kornylov, Zabuha, Shpynyov, P.Kryvosheyev, Starostin

1936. (part of the Cup of the Ukrainian SSR)

Quarterfinals
 Dynamo Kyiv - Dynamo Dnipropetrovsk 5:2
 KhTZ Kharkiv - Lokomotyv Kyiv 0:1
 Stakhanovets Stalino - Dynamo Odessa 2:3 (in Horlivka)
 Dynamo Kharkiv - ZiL Dnipropetrovsk 0:2
Semifinals
 Dynamo Kyiv - Lokomotyv Kyiv 2:1
 Dynamo Odessa - ZiL Dnipropetrovsk 1:0
Final
 Dynamo Kyiv - Dynamo Odessa 6:0
Dynamo Kyiv: Trusevych, Pravoverov, Klymenko, Tyutchev, Kuzmenko, Putystin, Honcharenko, Shylovsky, Shehodsky, Komarov, Korotkykh, Makhynya. Coach: Moisei Tovarovsky.

Performance by club

External links
 Championship of the Ukrainian SSR among cities teams. UkrSoccerHistory.com.
 1936 Championship of the Ukrainian SSR. "Zaria Lugansk" History and Statistics (http://football.lg.ua).
 Championships of Russia and Ukraine before 1936. helmsoccer.narod.ru.

Defunct football competitions in Ukraine
Sport in the Ukrainian Soviet Socialist Republic
Recurring sporting events established in 1921
1921 establishments in Ukraine